Rostov-Yaroslavsky (until 1904 was known as Rostov) is the passenger railway station in Rostov (Yaroslavl Oblast, Russia) and a stop along the Trans-Siberian Railway.

History 
The station was opened in 1870 on the Alexandrov - Yaroslavl section. The first train from Moscow to Rostov ran January 1 (13), 1870.

In 1958, during the electrification of the Alexandrov - Yaroslavl-Glavny section, the station was electrified with 3 kV direct current.

On October, 2020, a high-speed train "Lastochka" running from Moscow to Kostroma began to stop at Rostov-Yaroslavsky station, with the travel time of 2 hour 17 minutes from Moscow.

Terminal 
The station's appearance has changed several times over its long history. Old-timers still remember a small wooden structure with a stone central part - a waiting room and two-storey wings connected by a gallery.

The modern building of the station was built in 1975. The townspeople call it a "ship" for its resemblance to a large ocean liner, miraculously moored near the railroad tracks. Above the station towers a spire with a rook, the symbol of the city. The building is U-shaped and has 2 floors. The average height of the main premises is 3.35 m, the height of the lobby and hall is 8 m. The total area of the building by internal measurement is 1881.8 m2.

Activities 
The station is open for cargo operations.

Commercial operations performed at the station:

 sale of passenger tickets
 acceptance and delivery of luggage
 acceptance and delivery of wagonload consignments of cargo (open platforms)
 receipt and delivery of small consignments of goods (covered warehouses)
 receipt and delivery of wagonload and small consignments of cargo (sidings)
 receipt and delivery of wagonload consignments of cargo (covered warehouses)
 receipt and delivery of cargo in general-purpose containers (3 and 5 tons)
 reception and dispatch of cargo in general-purpose containers (20 tons)
 reception and delivery of small consignments (open yards)

References

Railway stations in Yaroslavl Oblast
Trans-Siberian Railway
Railway stations in the Russian Empire opened in 1870